Triple Play Baseball '96 is a video game developed by Canadian studio Extended Play and published by EA Sports for the Sega Genesis. An updated version titled Triple Play: Gold Edition was released exclusively for the Sega Genesis the following year and added updated 1996 rosters and a new "Professional Mode". Gold Edition was the runner up Genesis game of the year by Electronic Gaming Monthly.

Gameplay
Triple Play Baseball gives players the option of using an enlarged view or normal view, and allows for trading players, and includes a season mode and player stats.

Reception

Next Generation reviewed the Genesis version of the game, rating it three stars out of five, and stated that "Triple Play Baseball is a solid baseball effort, and it ranks right up there with Sega's [[World Series Baseball '95|World Series '95]]".

ReviewsElectronic Gaming Monthly (Jul, 1995)GamePro'' (Jul, 1995)
All Game Guide - 1998
Video Games & Computer Entertainment - Jun, 1995

References

1995 video games
Sega Genesis games
Sega Genesis-only games
Triple Play video games
Video games developed in Canada